The Allen Rocks are a small but distinctive group of rocks  east-northeast of Slattery Peak in the Kyle Hills, Ross Island. The feature includes a central nunatak that in outline resembles the letter 'A'. A low ridge encloses the nunatak except on the south. The group was named by the Advisory Committee on Antarctic Names in 2000 after Robert J. Allen of the U.S. Antarctic Resource Center, United States Geological Survey (USGS), Reston, Virginia, a cartographer and expert on aerial photography of Antarctica, who was closely involved in USGS mapping of the continent, 1950–2000.

References 

Rock formations of the Ross Dependency
Nunataks of Ross Island